Krūmiņš (Old orthography: Kru(h)min; feminine: Krūmiņa) is a Latvian topographic name, derived from the Latvian word for "bush" (krūms). Individuals with the surname include:

Edgars Krūmiņš (1909–unknown), Latvian chess master
Edgars Krūmiņš (born 1985), Latvian basketball player
Hugo Teodors Krūmiņš (1901–1990), Latvian writer
Jānis Krūmiņš (1930–1994), Latvian basketball player 
Mārtiņš Krūmiņš (1900–1992), Latvian-born American painter
Susan Krumins (née Kuijken; 1986), Dutch athlete

References

Latvian toponymic surnames
Latvian-language masculine surnames